Selaginella tortipila is a species of clubmoss in the family Selaginellaceae. It is referred to by the common names twistedhair spikemoss or kinky-hair spike-moss, and is a member of an early diverging group of plants. It is native to the Southeastern United States where it is found in a small area in the Southern Appalachian Mountains and Piedmont. It is found on granite or sandstone rock outcrop communities, often at high elevation.

Selaginella tortipila is a rather distinct species of spikemoss, and likely has no close relatives in the North American flora. It has been placed in the Bryodesma group, along with Selaginella rupestris.

References

tortipila
Taxa named by Alexander Braun